Semele is the mother of Dionysus in Greek mythology.

Semele may also refer to:

 Semele (Eccles), an opera by John Eccles
 Semele (Handel), an opera by George Frideric Handel (given as an oratorio in its first run)
 Sémélé, an opera by Marin Marais
 Sémélé (Dukas cantata), a cantata by Paul Dukas
 86 Semele, an asteroid
 Semele (plant), a genus of flowering plants
 Semele (bivalve), a genus of bivalves
 Radford Semele, a village in Warwickshire, England